Pure-Stat Baseball is a 1986 video game published by Sublogic.

Gameplay
Pure-Stat Baseball is a game in which baseball games are playable as solo games, player against player, or with the computer playing both teams.

Reception
Johnny Wilson reviewed the game for Computer Gaming World, and stated that "For those who want to have a computer league on Apple or Commodore machines, Pure-Stat provides a nice array of options and plenty of managerial challenges."

David M. Wilson and Johnny L. Wilson reviewed the game for Computer Gaming World, and stated that "The graphics routines (with their annoying flip-flop of the stadium perspective) still tend to slow play down, but the game is still significant because of the number of offensive choices available (seven relate to the batter and seven to the baserunner) and defensive options provided (four for the pitcher and five for the fielders)."

References

External links
Review in Family Computing
Article in RUN Magazine
Article in Ahoy!
Review in The Guide To Computer Living
Article in The Guide to Computer Living
Review in RUN Magazine
Review in Aktueller Software Markt
Review in Compute!'s Gazette

1986 video games
Apple II games
Baseball video games
Commodore 64 games
DOS games
Major League Baseball video games
Video games developed in the United States
Video games set in the United States